This is a list of electronic rock artists. Bands are listed alphabetically by the first letter in their name, and individuals are listed by first name.

0–9
 3Teeth
 +44

A
 A Flock of Seagulls
 Anamanaguchi
 The Anix
 Apollo 440
 Awolnation

B

 Battle Tapes
 The Big Pink
 The Birthday Massacre
 The Black Queen
 Blue Stahli
 Bonaparte
 Breathe Carolina
 Brick + Mortar
 Bring Me the Horizon

C

 Camouflage Nights
 Carpark North
 The Cassandra Complex
 Celldweller
 The Chemical Brothers
 The Chinese Stars
 Chromatics
 Circle of Dust
 Clan of Xymox
Coldrain
 Crosses
 CSS

D

 Daft Punk
 Datarock
 Dead by Sunrise
 Deadsy
 Dear Rouge
 Death in Vegas
 Delphic
 Depeche Mode
 Devo
 Doll Factory

E
 Empire of the Sun
 Enter Shikari
 Esprit D'Air

F

 Factory Floor
 Fatboy Slim
 Filter
 From Ashes to New

G

 Garbage
 Gary Numan
 Glass Candy

H
 Half Alive
 Health

I
 I Dont Know How But They Found Me
 I Fight Dragons
 I Will Never Be The Same
 Imagine Dragons
 Infected Mushroom
 Innerpartysystem
 In This Moment

J

 Julien-K
 Justice

K

 Kraftwerk
 The Killers

L

 Ladytron
 LCD Soundsystem
 Le Tigre
 Lights
 Linkin Park

M

 M83
 MGMT
 Moby
 Muse
 Modestep

N
 The Naked and Famous
 New Order
 Neu!
 Nine Inch Nails
 NYPC

O

 Orgy

P

 Panic! at the Disco
 Pendulum
 The Prodigy
 Powerman 5000
 PVRIS

R

 Radiohead
 Ratatat
 Republica

S
 Seefeel
Sextile
 Shiny Toy Guns
 Silver Apples
 Simple Creatures
 Starset
 Stereolab
 Suicide

T
 Tangerine Dream
 Tokio Hotel
 Twenty One Pilots

U

 United State of Electronica

W

 Walk the Moon
 Waterparks

X
The xx

See also
 List of electronic music genres
 List of synth-pop artists

References

Lists of musicians
Electronic music